Sir Harry Ripley Mackeson, 1st Baronet (25 May 1905 – 25 January 1964) was a British soldier and Conservative politician.

Mackeson was the son of Henry Mackeson and Ella Cecil Ripley. He served in the Royal Scots Greys regiment of the British Army and achieved the rank of Brigadier. In 1945 he was elected to the House of Commons for Hythe, a seat he held until 1950 when the constituency was abolished, and then represented Folkestone and Hythe until 1959. Mackeson served under Winston Churchill as a Lord of the Treasury from 1951 to 1952 and as Secretary for Overseas Trade from 1952 to 1953. In 1954 he was created a Baronet, of Hythe in the County of Kent.

Mackeson married Alethea Cecil Chetwynd-Talbot, daughter of Reginald George Chetwynd-Talbot, in 1940. He died in January 1964, aged 58, and was succeeded in the baronetcy by his son Rupert.

Notes

References
Kidd, Charles, Williamson, David (editors). Debrett's Peerage and Baronetage (1990 edition). New York: St Martin's Press, 1990,

External links 
 

1905 births
1964 deaths
Baronets in the Baronetage of the United Kingdom
British Army personnel of World War II
Conservative Party (UK) MPs for English constituencies
Ministers in the third Churchill government, 1951–1955
Royal Scots Greys officers
UK MPs 1945–1950
UK MPs 1950–1951
UK MPs 1951–1955
UK MPs 1955–1959